The 1995–96 Cincinnati Bearcats men's basketball team represented the University of Cincinnati in NCAA Division I competition in the 1995–96 season. The Bearcats, coached by Bob Huggins, won Conference USA and reached the Elite Eight of the 1996 NCAA tournament. The team finished with an overall record of 28–5 (11–3 GMWC) and a No. 7 ranking in the final AP poll.

Roster

Schedule

|-
!colspan=12 style=|Non-conference regular season

|-
!colspan=12 style=|C-USA Regular Season

|-
!colspan=12 style=|C-USA Tournament 

|-
!colspan=12 style=|NCAA Tournament

Rankings

Awards and honors
Danny Fortson – C-USA Player of the Year, Consensus Second-Team All-American

References

Cincinnati
Cincinnati Bearcats men's basketball seasons
Cincinnati
Cincinnati Bearcats men's basketball
Cincinnati Bearcats men's basketball